TG Sport  is a Mongolian sportswear manufacturer based in Ulaanbaatar.

Sponsorship
In August 2021 it was announced that the company had signed a two-year deal with the Mongolian Football Federation to provide kits for all Mongolian national teams.

References

External links
 Official Facebook

Sportswear brands
Companies based in Ulaanbaatar